Winchester Hospital located in Winchester, Massachusetts is a notable hospital in northwest suburb of the city of Boston, United States. It is affiliated with Lahey Health. The hospital provides inpatient service and integrated home care to the population residing in Winchester, Woburn, Reading, Wilmington, North Reading, Stoneham, Burlington, Billerica, Medford, Malden, Wakefield, Tewksbury and several other surrounding communities.

History
The hospital had a humble beginning in 1912 when the Winchester Visiting Nurse Association opened the first Winchester Hospital. It was a 12-bedded hospital on Washington Street. As the necessity to build a larger hospital became apparent, a  tract of land was bought by 1914, with the money raised by canvassing in the town and donation by a group of businessmen. A new, 44-bedded hospital was opened on May 18, 1917. The hospital has since expanded to 206 beds, and continues to be one of Massachusetts premiere hospitals for nursery care.

Area Served

North Reading
Reading
Stoneham
Wilmington
Winchester

See also
Winchester Hospital Chiropractic Center 
List of hospitals in Massachusetts

References

Hospital buildings completed in 1917
Hospitals in Middlesex County, Massachusetts
Hospitals established in 1912
Buildings and structures in Winchester, Massachusetts
1912 establishments in Massachusetts